Alessandro Sanquirico (27 July 1777, in Milan – 12 March 1849, in Milan) was an Italian scenic designer, architect, and painter. He began his career in conjunction with leading artists of the time such as Paolo Landriani, Giovanni Pedroni, Giovanni Perego, and Georgio Fuentes. Additionally, he studied architecture and perspective with Giuseppe Piermarini, the architect of the La Scala opera house.

Altogether, he designed over 300 productions for that house, including many premières. Specifically, they included four operas by Vincenzo Bellini.

Works

For fifteen years, from 1818 to 1832, Sanquirico dominated the visual style of La Scala, not only on stage, but also in the auditorium. He designed the ballets of Salvatore Viganò at the beginning of the 19th century, and the world premières of Rossini's La gazza ladra, Bellini's Il pirata, La straniera, La sonnambula as well as Norma in 1831. His set designs were prepared for Donizetti's works at La Scala, and these included Anna Bolena when it appeared there,  Ugo, conte di Parigi and L'elisir d'amore, both in 1832, and the premiere of Lucrezia Borgia in 1833.

He provided the decorations for the celebration of the crowning of Ferdinand I of Austria, as king of Lombardy and the Veneto. Additionally he worked in the Teatro Alberti in Desenzano, the Teatro Sociale in Canzo, the Teatro Sociale in Como, and the Teatro Municipale in Piacenza. He worked with Andrea Appiani and Bargigli  in the design of the Arena Civica of Milan and provided the scenography for ballets by Salvatore Viganò. He helped decorate ceilings in the Cathedral of Milan.

Assessment
In describing the scale of Sanquirico's work, Daniel Snowman discusses some its features in relation to the growing Romantic style of Italian opera from the 1820s forward: 
Stage designs took on new life as imaginative artists such as Sanquirico in Milan and Pierre-Luc-Charles Ciceri in Paris strove to re-create visually the spirit and scale of the Romantic dramas their designs would showcase. Sets would typically reveal a rich embellished foreground featuring evocative architecture of an earlier age, opening out onto a distant landscape bordered by a moving diorama instead of a static backcloth.

Paul Sheren further adds that the formula noted by Snowman "satisfied the aesthetic needs of romantic audiences for spectacle". Sheren concludes by noting that "one reason for Saquirico's international influence was the portfolios of hand-coloured engravings based on his theatrical and architectural drawings were published and extensively circulated and copied." An example of one of the Raccolta di varie decorazioni volumes is included in the "Sources" below.  They were published by Ricordi in Milan from 1818 onward.

Another noted aspect of his work was that stage lighting, initially oil and Argand lamps, worked well with "his balance of contrasts and colours", but they helped create the "moods suggested in the librettos of many operas [including] overwhelming panic at the impending destruction of Pompei in Pacini's L'ultimo giorno di Pompei for Naples in 1825" and for La Scala in 1826. Additionally, in regard to lighting, by the end of his career (he retired in 1832), Sanquirico adapted to the introduction of gas lighting with the result that "his painted scenery showed a sensitivity to the nuances of light".

On a broader scale on the advancement of operatic styles, Baker suggests that the spectacular set for L'ultimo giorno "played a significant role in the establishment of grand opera in Paris."

References
Notes

Cited sources
Baker, Evan (2013), "Alessandro Sanquirico" in From the Score to the Stage: An Illustrated History of Continental opera Production and Staging. Chicago and London: University of Chicago Press. . 
Bianconi, Lorenzo; Giorgio Pestelli (eds.)(1988) Storia dell'opera italiana. Edizione di Torino. . (Trans. of Kusmick Hansell, see below) 
 Biography on balletto.net 
Kusmick Hansell, Kathleen et al. (1988), Il ballo teatrali e l'opera italiana
Morbio, Vittoria Crespi (2013), Alessandro Sanquirico. Teatro, feste, trionfi (1777-1849), Allemandi  
Sanquirico, Alessandro (1830), Raccolta di varie decorazioni sceniche inventate e dipinte dal pittore Alessandro Sanquirico per I´ll Reale teatro alla Scala in Milano.  Milan and Florence: Ricordi & Co. c.  1830-40 (1830). Presumed to be 3rd edition following 1818—29 versions. Available on Internet Archive
Sheren, Paul (1998), "Sanquirico, Alessandro", in Stanley Sadie, (Ed.), The New Grove Dictionary of Opera, Vol. Four. London: Macmillan Publishers, Inc.   
Snowman, Daniel (2009), The Gilded Stage: A Social History of Opera. London: Atlantic Books.

Bibliography

External links
 W.H. Crain Costume and Scene Design Collection at the Harry Ransom Center

1777 births
1849 deaths
18th-century Italian painters
Italian male painters
19th-century Italian painters
Italian scenic designers
Painters from Milan
19th-century Italian male artists
18th-century Italian male artists